"You Have More Friends Than You Know", by Jeff Marx and Mervyn Warren, was commissioned by Hancher Auditorium at the University of Iowa for It Gets Better, a touring stage production which premiered at the University of Iowa in 2013. 

Marx recorded the song and released the single online along with an instrumental version, with a portion of the proceeds to benefit The Trevor Project. A variety of other versions are featured on the song's website, where others touched by the song are encouraged to record their own version to spread its message.

The television show Glee featured a cover of the song in its April 18, 2013, episode and sung by Darren Criss, Melissa Benoist, Alex Newell and Chord Overstreet.

References 

 Stagetube, (2013) BroadwayWorld.com, AUDIO: Jeff Marx Song 'You Have More Friends Than You Know' to Premiere on GLEE Tomorrow 
 Jonathan Higbee, (2013) Instinct Magazine, Glee Covers GMCLA's Original Song For The It Gets Better Tour, 'You Have More Friends Than You Know'
 Perez Hilton, (2013), PerezHilton.com, Sweet Dreams Are Made Of GLEE! Listen To All The NEW Songs From This Week's Episode HERE!
 Rob Cline, (2013), Iowa Now, ''Hancher-commissioned song to be performed on 'Glee'''

External links 

 

2013 songs
Songs written by Mervyn Warren